Alfredo Aglietti (born 16 September 1970) is an Italian football manager and a former player, who played as a striker, most recently in charge of Serie B club Brescia.

Playing career
Aglietti started his career at amateur club Rondinella, before a stint at Pontedera saw him land in Reggina by 1994, playing in Serie C1 at the time. having had a sublime goal scoring record at lower level, Aglietti quickly adapted to his new surroundings, and following a promotion and a successful season in Serie B as the follow-up, Aglietti caught the eyes of the prestigious Serie A club Napoli, where he was involved in taking the club to the Coppa Italia final of 1997, and becoming the club top scorer in the league season, netting eight league goals.

Following Napoli's purchases of Igor Protti and Claudio Bellucci, Aglietti was sold to Hellas Verona, where he spent three seasons, scoring 18 league goals for the club in 73 appearances. He then played for their local rivals Chievo, before going to Arezzo, where he finished his professional career.

Coaching career
Some appearances for amateur clubs later, he then switched to become a youth coach at several clubs, before taking charge at Empoli in 2010. On 2 October 2011, he was sacked and replaced by Giuseppe Pillon. On 12 February 2012 he was recalled by the same team as head coach, until the end of the season.

On 18 November 2012 he was named new coach of Novara in Serie B.

He successively served as head coach of Virtus Entella (Serie B) in 2015–16, and Ascoli (Serie B) during the 2016–17 season.

In November 2017, he made a comeback in charge of Virtus Entella. He was sacked from Virtus Entella on 7 May 2018, with the team in the relegation zone with two games to go.

On 2 May 2019 he was named to replace Fabio Grosso at the helm of Serie B club Hellas Verona, with the goal to help the club getting into the promotion playoffs. Under his short tenure, he managed to guide the club to fifth place in the regular season, and then to the promotion playoff finals, where Verona defeated Cittadella to achieve promotion to Serie A after only a single season in the second division. Despite his successes, however, Aglietti was not confirmed for another season, and Ivan Jurić was named as his replacement in charge of the club a few days later.

On 1 March 2020, he was signed by Serie B club Chievo. After guiding Chievo to the 2020–21 Serie B promotion playoffs, he left the Gialloblu to accept an offer from Serie B club Reggina, effective from 1 July 2021. On 13 December 2021, he was fired by Reggina following 5 consecutive losses.

On 21 December 2022, Aglietti was appointed new head coach of Serie B club Brescia. He was however sacked on 16 January 2023, after just two games in charge, with his predecessor Pep Clotet being reinstated as head coach.

Managerial statistics

References

External links
Alfredo Aglietti at Soccerway

Living people
1970 births
Italian footballers
Association football forwards
Italian football managers
S.S. Arezzo players
A.C. ChievoVerona players
Hellas Verona F.C. players
S.S.C. Napoli players
Reggina 1914 players
U.S. Città di Pontedera players
U.S. Pistoiese 1921 players
Serie A players
Serie B players
Serie C players
Serie D players
Empoli F.C. managers
Novara F.C. managers
Hellas Verona F.C. managers
A.C. ChievoVerona managers
Reggina 1914 managers
Brescia Calcio managers
Serie B managers